Garudabilli is a village and panchayat in Bondapalli mandal, Vizianagaram district of Andhra Pradesh, India.

Transport
Garudabilli railway station is located on Vizianagaram-Raipur main line in East Coast Railway, Indian Railways.

References

Villages in Vizianagaram district